The national question (in ) is an expression referring to the discussion about the future status of Quebec within Canada, taking into consideration issues of autonomy, sovereignty, and independence.

Various political positions in answer to the national question
Quebec sovereignty movement
Independence with an economic union with Canada
Independence without an economic union with Canada
Quebec federalism
Further autonomy within the Canadian federation, along with national recognition as a distinct society and autonomous province separate from other provinces in country
Asymmetrical federalism
Status quo

See also
Politics of Quebec
1980 Quebec referendum
1995 Quebec referendum

Nationalism
État Québécois
Commission on the Political and Constitutional Future of Quebec
Robert Bourassa's speech on the end of the Meech Lake Accord
Quebec nationalism

Sovereigntism
Sovereigntist events and strategies
Quebec sovereigntism

Federalism
Meech Lake Accord
Charlottetown Accord
Distinct society
Quebec federalist ideology
Quebec autonomism

Politics of Quebec
National questions